The PEN/Voelcker Award for Poetry is given biennially to an American poet whose distinguished and growing body of work to date represents a notable and accomplished presence in American literature.

The award is one of many PEN awards sponsored by International PEN affiliates in over 145 PEN centers around the world. The PEN America awards have been characterized as being among the "major" American literary prizes.

Winners

See also
American poetry
List of poetry awards
List of literary awards
List of years in poetry
List of years in literature

References

External links
PEN/Voelcker Award for Poetry

PEN America awards
Awards established in 1994
1994 establishments in the United States
American poetry awards